Nenad Todorović (Serbian Cyrillic: Ненад Toдopoвић; born 26 May 1982) is a Serbian football defender.

Career 
Before moving to Hungary in summer 2009 to play with Zalaegerszegi TE Nenad has played with Serbian SuperLiga clubs OFK Beograd and FK Hajduk Kula.

Notes 

1982 births
Living people
People from Bačka Topola
Serbian footballers
Association football defenders
OFK Beograd players
FK Hajduk Kula players
Zalaegerszegi TE players
Pécsi MFC players
Serbian SuperLiga players
Serbian expatriate footballers
Expatriate footballers in Hungary
Serbian expatriate sportspeople in Hungary
FK TSC Bačka Topola players